The 20º Corona Rally México, the third round of the 2006 World Rally Championship season took place from March 3–5, 2006.

Event
The event saw the first win of the season for Sébastien Loeb. After a spirited battle with Petter Solberg over the first two days - that saw both drivers suffering problems(Loeb losing power steering on stage 13 and Solberg's Subaru colliding with a dog) - Loeb eventually pulled clear to give the Belgian Kronos team their first WRC victory. Marcus Grönholm had a less successful event, suffering a crash on day one and having to rejoin the rally on day two under Superally rules.
Despite a twenty-minute penalty, he managed to pick up a point for eighth place. Manfred Stohl collected the final podium place with his Peugeot 307.

Results

Retirements

  Xavier Pons - engine (SS8)
  Fumio Nutahara - excluded (SS7)
  Sebastián Beltrán - accident (SS8)
  Gabriel Pozzo - differential (SS8)

Special stages
All dates and times are CST (UTC-6).

Championship standings after the event

Drivers' championship

Manufacturers' championship

References

External links
 Results at eWRC.com
 Results from the official site: WRC.com
 Results at Jonkka's World Rally Archive

Mexico
Rally Mexico
Rally